Fairhaven was a small settlement in Norton County, Kansas, United States.

History
Fairhaven was issued a post office in 1879. The post office was discontinued in 1904.

References

Former populated places in Norton County, Kansas
Former populated places in Kansas